Irena Oženko (née Dukhnovich; born 13 November 1962) is a Lithuanian former long jumper who competed for the Soviet Union.

Her stand-out performance came in Budapest in 1986 when she jumped . This ranked her fourth in the world for that year. This remains a Lithuanian record and a best for the Baltic states. It also puts her in the world's top twenty athletes ever for the event, as of 2016.

She also represented the Soviet Union at the 1982 European Athletics Championships, coming twelfth overall.

References

External links

All-Athletics profile

Living people
1962 births
Soviet female long jumpers
Lithuanian female long jumpers